Taxenbach is a market town in the district of Zell am See (Pinzgau region), in the state of Salzburg in Austria.

Population

References

Cities and towns in Zell am See District
Salzburg Slate Alps
Glockner Group
Goldberg Group